Charles Roach (2 June 1908, Shrewsbury - 4 May 2003, Marazion) was Archdeacon of the Seychelles from 1951 until 1955.

Roach was educated at De Aston Grammar School, Sidney Sussex College, Cambridge and Westcott House, Cambridge. After a curacy at Boston parish church he was a Chaplain in Baghdad. After this he was the incumbent at Emmanuel, West Dulwich before his appointment as Archdeacon and St Saviour, Croydon afterwards. His final post was as Chaplain at St Michael's Mount.

References

20th-century Anglican priests
Alumni of Sidney Sussex College, Cambridge
Alumni of Westcott House, Cambridge
Archdeacons of the Seychelles
People educated at De Aston School